Incision and drainage (I&D), also known as clinical lancing, are minor surgical procedures to release pus or pressure built up under the skin, such as from an abscess, boil, or infected paranasal sinus. It is performed by treating the area with an antiseptic, such as iodine-based solution, and then making a small incision to puncture the skin using a sterile instrument such as a sharp needle or a pointed scalpel. This allows the pus fluid to escape by draining out through the incision.

Good medical practice for large abdominal abscesses requires insertion of a drainage tube, preceded by insertion of a PICC line to enable readiness of treatment for possible septic shock.

Adjunct antibiotics
Uncomplicated cutaneous abscesses do not need antibiotics after successful drainage.

In incisional abscesses
For incisional abscesses, it is recommended that incision and drainage is followed by covering the area with a thin layer of gauze followed by sterile dressing. The dressing should be changed and the wound irrigated with normal saline at least twice each day. In addition, it is recommended to administer an antibiotic active against staphylococci and streptococci, preferably vancomycin when there is a risk of MRSA. The wound can be allowed to close by secondary intention. Alternatively, if the infection is cleared and healthy granulation tissue is evident at the base of the wound, the edges of the incision may be reapproximated, such as by using butterfly stitches, staples or sutures.

See also
 Drain (surgery)
 Ubi pus, ibi evacua

References

Surgical procedures and techniques